Salmiech (Languedocien: Saumièg or Salmièg) is a commune in the Aveyron department in the Occitanie region in southern France.

Geography
The village lies on the right bank of the Céor, which flows west through its southern part.

Population

See also
Communes of the Aveyron department

References

External links

Commune de Salmiech – official site (in French)

Communes of Aveyron
Aveyron communes articles needing translation from French Wikipedia